Route 265 is a highway in southwest Missouri.  Its northern terminus is at Interstate 44 in Mount Vernon; its southern terminus is at U.S. Route 65 (for which it was numbered after) south of Branson.  Much of the highway is concurrent with other routes (including Route 39, U.S. Route 60, Route 413, Route 13, Route 76, and Route 165). It is also known as the Ozark Mountain Parkway.

Major intersections

References

265
Transportation in Lawrence County, Missouri
Transportation in Christian County, Missouri
Transportation in Stone County, Missouri
Transportation in Taney County, Missouri